Andrés Ulises Castillo Villarreal (born 1980) is a Mexican serial killer active in his hometown of Chihuahua City, raping and murdering at least three men and raping a teenager between 2009 and 2015.  He confessed to around 12 murders, earning him the nicknames The Chihuahua Ripper and The Urban Development Ripper. He can be classified as an organized, sedentary and hedonistic murderer motivated by sexual compulsion. He was sentenced to 120 years imprisonment in 2017.

Modus operandi 
Castillo, who was a narcomenudista, attracted his victims (young men who used methamphetamines) with the promise of giving them drugs, driving them to secluded places on the outskirts of town or their own home, where he would drug and intoxicate them. Afterwards, he would hit them on the head with a blunt object to first incapacitate and rape them, before hitting them on the head to kill them. The bodies would then always be dismembered with a coping saw. Castillo would then transport the remains in a wheelbarrow to abandon them in vacant places, where he would either hide them partially or bury them completely. It is known that at least one of his victims had been buried under the floor of his house. Additionally, he would always leave toys next to the mutilated bodies as a "signature".

Confirmed victims

Murder of Lorenzo Ernesto Olivas Barrios 
Castillo's first identified victim was Lorenzo Ernesto Olivas Barrios, a 22-year-old man from Delicias, who had moved months before his death to the city of Chihuahua to work in a food company. He lived with relatives in Colonia Vista Hermosa before disappearing on November 13, 2015, saying to a relative that he was going to buy "some dinner", but never returned. Three days later, on November 16, his relatives reported his disappearance; they would not hear any news about him until the following day, when the dismembered remains of a man were found by some neighbors of the Urban Development Company.

The arms and legs were found inside an abandoned house on Novena and San Abel Streets. Two days later the torso and head were found on a street next to the house, on the streets Once y Álamos, partially hidden inside a tree trunk at the bottom of a dry stream, and above the remains a front half of a tricycle was found. DNA tests confirmed the victim's identity. According to subsequent inquiries, it was determined that on the night of November 13, Olivas would have gone to a bar called "California" on Nueva España Street and R. Alameda, where he met with Castillo. He accompanied him to his home on Ninth Street in the same neighborhood, where after consuming methamphetamines, Castillo assaulted, raped and murdered him, hitting his head with a hammer until the skull was destroyed. After dismembering the body in the bathroom, he then coerced with threats of killing a teenager to help him transport the remains. Both then returned to his home on Ninth Street, where they cleaned and painted the walls stained with blood. Castillo later raped the young man.

Murder of Daniel Alfonso Rodríguez Morales 
On December 13, 2015, more dismembered remains from another man were found, in exactly the same stream, very close to where the first ones were found. The body had only had its legs cut at the knees that were wrapped in a blanket, with the rest of the body also being partially hidden in the trunk, the skull smashed with blows to the head, but there were also two wounds by a .22 caliber firearm. Near the body, the rear half of the same tricycle used in the first case was also found. All the similarities between the two findings, that of Lorenzo Olivas' remains and this new discovery, made it clear that they had been killed by the same person. The victim was identified as Daniel Alfonso Rodríguez Morales, nicknamed "El Troya", 22 years old, who lived in the same Urban Development neighborhood, and had been seen alive for the last time on the same day on the discovery of his remains. Two years earlier, the victim had been arrested for trying to break into a car.

According to the reconstruction of the events after the murder of Lorenzo Olivas, the murderer moved with deceit to the house of a friend located on Álamos Street in the Urban Development neighborhood, continuing to harass the teenager whom he forced to help him and made him move into his house on December 13. Castillo then invited his new victim to a friend's house, drugging him in front of the host and the teenager, and proceeding to hit him on the head with a rock to kill him. He forced the two witnesses under the threat of death to help him get rid of the body.

Murder of Fernando Valles Gandarilla 
The last confirmed victim was Fernando Valles, who disappeared on the same day that Daniel Rodríguez was murdered and his mutilated body found, Fernando was the brother of a "friend" of Andrés Castillo, Jesús Valles Gandarilla, who was the main caretaker of the latter, who had lost both of his legs in an accident. Jesús would declare that he knew that his brother had visited Castillo before disappearing, but he told him that his brother had left the house and did not know where he went. Jesús believed Castillo, thinking that his brother had simply "abandoned" him. The truth was that Castillo drugged, raped and beat him in the same house where he had killed Daniel Rodríguez. The body on Fernando Valles was found on December 18, 2015, under the floor of Castillo's room, where he had made a pit to place the body and covered it with rocks and cement. The face and entire skull were destroyed.

Possible victims 
Upon his arrest, Andrés Castillo confessed to killing 12 people, but according to the prosecution of Chihuahua, he might be involved in about 20 murders. Some of the victims attributed to the killer are:

 José Urías Hernández: beaten to death, his body was found next to a warehouse on Calle Industrial Sur N#1, on the Robinson Industrial Complex.
 Miguel Ángel Castillo Quintana: 21-year-old man, murdered on August 7, 2015; his killer had hit him on the head to kill him, and he was found on the day of his death in the Ferro-construction warehouse building on Nueva Spain Avenue. He was face down, naked from the waist down.
 Gabriel García Hernández: his dismembered body was found on August 3, 2015, beaten to death.
 Guillermo Juárez Portillo: his mutilated body was found in the Robinson Industrial Complex on May 8, 2015, beaten to death.
 "John Doe": the dismembered body of an unidentified man was found under a bridge on Pacheco Avenue, on November 29, 2014.
 ''"John Doe"'': the dismembered body of an unidentified man was found on the railway tracks in the interjection with Pacheco Avenue, on August 2, 2014.
 Gustavo Adrián Saldaña Hernández: his dismembered body was found on Cesar Sandino Street and Francisco Villa Colony on April 3, 2012.
 José Manuel Chavira Olivas: his dismembered body was found on R. Almada and Periférico Neandertal Street, on October 2, 2009.

Psychiatric profile 

Andrés Castillo was characterized by profilers as a psychopath and a classic sexual sadist. It is known that Castillo was the victim of repeated sexual abuse during his childhood, and in the opinion Nicolás González, the fact that all his victims were male and the way in which he committed the murders is a sign of the "emotional charge" of the abuses performed on him. According to the hypothesis of the criminal profilers, Castillo would've relived the sexual abuses he experienced by switching roles, where he was no longer the helpless victim but the perpetrator with absolute power.

Within the modus operandi of the Chihuahua Ripper, it highlights his obsessive behaviors as the fact that he used the same coping saw in each of the homicides and especially the ritualistic behavior of leaving toys next to the bodies, according to a hypothesis of the specialists of the prosecutor's office these toys represented "the gifts that he could've received as a child", apparently projecting himself as he was a child to his victims, culturally with the toys being a common ofrenda for a dead child.

Detention and conviction 
Andrés Castillo was arrested on January 6, 2016 in Vista Cerro Grande colony, as he was in possession of several doses of methamphetamine. He emphasizes the fact that in the last of his crimes he would have been very careless in contrast to the previous murders, where he conducted himself in a methodical way that he left no evidence, believing that he would never be captured. On December 5, 2017, he was sentenced to 120 years imprisonment.

See also
List of serial killers by country
List of serial killers by number of victims

External links 
 View of Álamo Street, Urban Development Colony, in Chihuahua City, Chihuahua. In the house with number 6841 of this street, Andrés Castillo Villarreal committed his last two murders.

References 

1980 births
Living people
Male serial killers
Mexican rapists
Mexican serial killers
Pages with unreviewed translations
People from Chihuahua (state)
Violence against men in North America